Spring Night is a 1954 novel by the Norwegian writer Tarjei Vesaas. It tells the story of two siblings who for the first time spend a night without their parents, and are visited by strangers who ask for room for the night. An English translation by Kenneth G. Chapman was published in 1964, in a shared volume with Vesaas' novel The Seed.

Spring Night was the basis for a 1976 film with the same title, directed by Erik Solbakken.

References

External links
 Publicity page at the Norwegian publisher's website 

1954 Norwegian novels
20th-century Norwegian novels
Norwegian-language novels
Norwegian novels adapted into films
Novels by Tarjei Vesaas